A hair museum is a museum that has displays of hair, hair art, and/or items or paintings made using hair, for example that of celebrities. Hair museums date back to the 19th century.

History of hair art
Hair art was a form of art that began in the 15th century and flourished in the Victorian era. This form of art was used by people to keep the memory of a loved one before cameras were invented.  According to the Minnesota history magazine hair art originated in England and France, then made its way to the United States. This form of art consisted of necklaces, bracelets, rings, lockets, paintings, and medallions. These items would be embellished with strands of hair from a loved one.

Avanos Hair Museum
A pottery center/guest house in Avanos, Turkey, created the Avanos Hair Museum; its displays are thousands of locks of hair, all from female visitors. Reportedly the local potter, Chez Galip, was bidding farewell to a friend of his when he asked for something to remember her by, and she cut off a piece of her hair to leave as a reminder. He put it up in his shop, and told the story to the visitors and tourists who passed through. Other women who enjoyed the story left a piece of their hair as well. The museum started in 1979 when a selection was put up for display. It now holds an estimated 16,000 samples by the museum's own count and is included in the Guinness Book of World Records.

Twice a year, in June and December, the first customer who comes in Chez Galip’s shop is invited down into the Hair Museum to choose ten winners off the walls. These ten receive an all-expenses-paid week-long vacation in Cappadocia, where they participate in his pottery workshops for free.

Leila's Hair Museum

One of the most famous and oldest hair museums is Leila's Hair Museum, located in Kansas City, Missouri.

References

Sources
 Castaneda, Erin. "Hair art history unlocked." LJWorld. 7 Aug. 2009. Accessed 20 October 2009.
 Hendricks, Mike. "Mike Hendricks column: Go ahead, Philly, and try to top this." The Kansas City Star, 18 February 2008: 1–3.
 "Human Hair Ornaments." Minnesota History Summer 1974: 70–74. Minnesota History. Minnesota Historical Society collections. Accessed 21 October 2009.
 Kirby, Doug, Ken Smith, and Mike Wilkins. "Leila's Hair Museum." RoadsideAmerica. Accessed 16 October 2009.
 "Leila's Hair Museum ." Hairworks. Accessed 16 October 2009.
 Rombeck, Terry. "Museum tangled in history of hair." LJWorld. Accessed 20 October 2009.
 Uhlenbroch, Tom. "Strand by strand, museum dedicated to collecting hair art." St. Louis Post-Dispatch (MO) 28 April 2005: 1–2.

Museum
Types of museums